The 2003 Chevrolet Grand Prix of Atlanta was the second race of the 2003 American Le Mans Series season.  It took place at Road Atlanta, Georgia on June 29, 2003.

Official results
Class winners in bold.  Cars failing to complete 75% of winner's distance marked as Not Classified (NC).

Statistics
 Pole Position - #16 Dyson Racing - 1:13.748
 Fastest Lap - #1 Infineon Team Joest - 1:13.932
 Distance - 523.230 km
 Average Speed - 189.677 km/h

External links
  
 Race Results

A
Grand Prix of Atlanta
Grand Prix of Atlanta